The ninth generation of the Ford Thunderbird is a personal luxury coupe that was manufactured and marketed by Ford for the 1983 to 1988 model years. In response to the sales downturn of the 1980–1982 Thunderbird, the Thunderbird underwent an extensive model revision for the 1983 model year. While remaining a personal luxury coupe (to minimize overlap with the Ford Mustang), the redesign of the Thunderbird marked a transition of the model range, emphasizing performance and handling over outright luxury and comfort content.  As a central theme of the design, the ninth-generation Thunderbird marks the introduction of highly aerodynamic body design to Ford vehicles in North America (reducing its drag coefficient from 0.50 to 0.35), followed by similarly designed model lines, including the 1984 Ford Mustang SVO, 1984 Ford Tempo, 1986 Ford Aerostar, and 1986 Ford Taurus.  

The ninth-generation of the Thunderbird is derived from the Ford Fox platform, as with 1980 Thunderbird (though with a shorter wheelbase). The 4.9 L V8 (5.0 L by Ford) made its return for 1983, coupled with the first (and only) four-cylinder Thunderbird.  Powered by a variant of the Mustang SVO drivetrain, the Thunderbird Turbo Coupe was developed as a high-performance variant.    The ninth-generation Thunderbird is the counterpart of the Mercury Cougar (returning solely to a coupe configuration) and the Continental (later Lincoln) Mark VII (1984–1992).      

As with its predecessor, the ninth-generation Ford Thunderbird was produced in Atlanta Assembly and Lorain Assembly (in Hapeville, Georgia, and Lorain, Ohio, respectively). For the 1989 model year, this generation was replaced by the tenth-generation Ford Thunderbird, as the model line shifted from the Fox platform to the MN12 platform.

Development
Following the introduction of the 1980 Thunderbird, sales of the nameplate sharply decreased in comparison to its 1977–1979 predecessor, despite it being a more fuel-efficient vehicle. As the 1970s turned into the 1980s, personal luxury cars gradually became more sporting in image, with vehicles as the BMW 6-Series increasing in popularity. In 1980, Ford President Donald Petersen asked Ford Vice President of Design Jack Telnack of the 1980 Thunderbird: "is this what you would want in your driveway?". The negative response by Telnack prompted the company to request the Thunderbird to be restyled completely.

A Lincoln proposal was designed in the Lincoln-Mercury Studio which Mr. Peterson liked. Dave Royer was assigned the task of putting a design similar to that on the Thunderbird package. He and Master Modeler Sam Borg put the clay model together in a very short period of time. Caldwell approved it and Royer then developed it further in the wind tunnel. Many members of design management thought it was a mistake. One high level design management person referred to it as a "Burnt Tennis Shoe."

To give the car a more contemporary image, the body was completely redesigned from the ground up. Aside from the egg-crate grille and the Thunderbird emblem (which were both significantly updated), no styling cues were carried over. As a necessity to control development costs, the 1983 Thunderbird was forced to retain its Fox-platform chassis, including some of the interior being carried over slightly modified from the previous generation. In the style of the Ford Probe concept cars and the 1982 Ford Sierra, the Thunderbird was designed for aerodynamic efficiency alongside its looks, with many of its body panels having rounded edges and its doors wrapping into the roof. In extreme contrast to its predecessors of the late 1970s, the 1983 Thunderbird was designed to minimize the use of chrome trim; some trim levels limited it exclusively to the wheels. The car was launched on February 17, 1982.

Model year changes

1983–1986

Following its redesign for the 1983 model year, the Thunderbird was available in base, Heritage, or Turbo Coupe, which was the most expensive performance-oriented model. Both the base and the Heritage came standard with a  Essex V6 that was rated at  mated to a three-speed automatic transmission. The Turbo Coupe, the top-of-the-line model was special for several reasons. It used a turbocharged  four-cylinder engine with Ford's EEC-IV electronic engine control system. Unlike the other models, the Turbo Coupe came with a standard five-speed manual transmission. Other improvements included a limited-slip differential (called "Traction-Lok"), larger tires and wheels, and a sportier interior complete with analog gauges.

For the 1984 model year, few changes were made. The Turbo Coupe gained a three-speed automatic transmission as an option. A Fila model was introduced, which featured two-tone white and gray paint with red and blue pinstriping, white leather interior, and wheel choices, as well as Fila logo badges. The mid-range Heritage model was renamed élan.

For 1985, the Thunderbird celebrated its 30th year in the Ford model lineup; a 30th Anniversary Edition model was offered, that featured unique blue paint and stripes, and came loaded with options. It was loosely based on the élan trim and most examples were equipped with the 5.0 L V8. All Thunderbirds received an updated interior with a redesigned instrument panel. The grille and taillamps were also revised.

Minor changes were made in 1986, including the addition of a center high mount stop lamp, and the deletion of the FILA edition. In 1986, Ford began work on the "MN12" project which would serve as the basis for an all-new Thunderbird generation. Supposed to compete against the BMW 6-Series, Ford believed that the new Thunderbird would be too big a change for the public and still wanted to capitalize on the success that the existing generation of Thunderbirds had brought.

1987–1988

For the 1987 model year, the exterior of the Thunderbird was updated to further improve its aerodynamic performance. The headlights were changed from sealed-beam units to flush-mounted composite units and the rear quarter glass was also flush-mounted. Thunderbird Turbo Coupes were distinguished by their own front bodywork, which did away with a traditional front grille, featuring functional hood scoops directed to the intercooler. In sharp contrast to the Thunderbirds of a decade before, chrome trim was used only sparingly; on Turbo Coupes, the only chrome trim on the entire car was the Thunderbird emblems and lettering. The model lineup was further changed; to bring the Thunderbird in line with other Ford models, the élan trim was dropped, replaced with LX and Sport versions. The LX was equipped with the V6 while the Sport was equipped with the V8. 

Turbo Coupes gained an intercooler, essentially giving the car the powertrain of the Mustang SVO. Turbo Coupes were equipped with anti-lock disc brakes on all wheels, Automatic Ride Control, and 16-inch 225/60VR performance tires. The Turbo Coupe also featured a performance-styled front valance with fog lights and special trim with "Turbo Coupe" badges on the doors, as well as "Snowflake" 16 inch alloy wheels. The Thunderbird Turbo Coupe was named the Motor Trend Car of the Year for 1987. 1988, the final year for the Turbo Coupe, saw only minor changes. The five-speed manual transmission now allowed the full 15 psi of boost in all forward gears (as opposed to excluding the first two gears). The Turbo Coupe was replaced in 1989 by the Super Coupe which had a 3.8 L supercharged V6 engine — a radical departure from the old turbo four-cylinder.

Production totals

References

009
Rear-wheel-drive vehicles
Coupés
Motor vehicles manufactured in the United States
Cars introduced in 1983
Personal luxury cars
Cars discontinued in 1988